Posterior circulation infarct (POCI) is a type of cerebral infarction affecting the posterior circulation supplying one side of the brain.

Posterior circulation stroke syndrome (POCS) refers to the symptoms of a patient who clinically appears to have had a posterior circulation infarct, but who has not yet had any diagnostic imaging (e.g. CT Scan) to confirm the diagnosis.

It can cause the following symptoms:
 Cranial nerve palsy AND contralateral motor/sensory defect
 Bilateral motor or sensory defect
 Eye movement problems (e.g.nystagmus)
 Cerebellar dysfunction
 Isolated homonymous hemianopia
 Vertigo

It has also been associated with deafness.

See also
 Stroke
 Artery of Percheron

References

External links 

Stroke